Mickey Lee Lane (born Sholom Mayer Schreiber; February 2, 1941, Rochester, New York – March 18, 2011) was an American songwriter and arranger.

Lane got a job in the Brill Building as a songwriter in the 1950s, working with Neil Sedaka as a touring pianist and Bill Haley as a songwriter. In addition, he released some singles on Brunswick Records and Swan Records in the 1950s and 1960s; one of them, "Shaggy Dog", became a hit and peaked at #38 on the Billboard Hot 100. His tune "Hey Sah-Lo-Ney" was covered by British group The Action, The Detroit Cobras (retitled "Hey Sailor") and Ronnie Spector on her solo album The Last of the Rock Stars.	

Lane continued working as a recording engineer from the late 1960s into the 1990s. Toward the end of the century, a compilation disc entitled Rockin' On...And Beyond was released, which featured both his previous singles and unreleased material.

Discography

Compilation albums
Rockin' On...And Beyond (1997)

EPs
Shaggy Dog (1964)

Singles

References

Musicians from New York (state)
Songwriters from New York (state)
1941 births
2011 deaths